Two Suns is the second studio album by English singer Natasha Khan, known professionally as Bat for Lashes. It was released on 3 April 2009 by The Echo Label and Parlophone. The album was produced by Khan herself and David Kosten (who also worked on her debut album Fur and Gold), and features collaborations with members of Yeasayer and Scott Walker. Two Suns was recorded in segments in California, New York City, London, Brighton and Wales.

Upon its release, Two Suns was met with positive reviews from most critics. Additionally, it was shortlisted for the Mercury Prize in 2009, Khan's second nomination after Fur and Gold in 2007. On 31 July 2009, Two Suns was certified gold by the British Phonographic Industry (BPI), for shipments of 100,000 copies in the United Kingdom. It debuted at number two on Billboards Heatseekers Albums chart and has sold 56,000 copies in United States, according to Nielsen SoundScan. As of June 2012, the album had sold 250,000 copies worldwide.

Concept
According to the accompanying press release, Two Suns is "a record of modern-day fables exploring dualities on a number of levels—two lovers, two planets, two sides of a personality", bringing reflection about "the philosophy of the self and duality, examining the need for both chaos and balance, for both love and pain, in addition to touching on metaphysical ideas concerning the connections between all existence." In Two Suns, Khan also presents an alter ego named Pearl, described by the press release as "a destructive, self-absorbed, blonde, femme fatale of a persona who acts as a direct foil to Khan's more mystical, desert-born spiritual self."

Promotion
"Daniel" was released on 1 March 2009 as the album's lead single, reaching number 36 on the UK Singles Chart. Both "Siren Song" and the 909s in DarkTimes mix of "Sleep Alone" were featured in the first season of the American television series The Vampire Diaries, while only the latter was included on the series' soundtrack album. The song "Glass" was used in the trailer for the 2012 video game Assassin's Creed III: Liberation.

Critical reception

Two Suns received generally positive reviews from music critics. At Metacritic, which assigns a normalised rating out of 100 to reviews from mainstream publications, the album received an average score of 76, based on 32 reviews. Kevin Liedel of Slant Magazine called it "dark, but never needlessly so", and wrote that it "offers a rich, distinct world of subterranean lullabies, spacey timbres, and ghostly beauty." Mark Pytlik of Pitchfork called it a "significant step forward from her debut" and "home to some of the year's most thrilling music so far." Tim Chester of NME described Two Suns as "a brilliant pop album", commenting that it is "epic in scope and ambition and requires a similarly epic patience to unravel its charms". Barry Walters of Spin wrote that "this art-rock Joan of Arc gushes duality motifs that thwart narrative but overflow with moonstruck sensuality." The A.V. Clubs Sean O'Neal commented that "Khan's sublime voice easily distracts from any lyrical ponderousness, and it lends even lines about 'diamonds burning through rainbows' a dreamy sort of sense." The Guardians Dorian Lynskey called it "fantastic as well as fantastical", noting that "[w]hereas her debut relied on charisma and imagination to paper over the songwriting cracks, [Two Suns] is agleam with striking melodies". Melissa Maerz of Rolling Stone felt that "[s]omehow, the music melts away the potential for hokeyness ... Khan proves she's a powerhouse under her billowy sleeves."

AllMusic's Heather Phares complimented Khan's "considerable skills at telling a story and setting a mood", but critiqued that "the album's massive concepts and sounds require a little more time and patience to unravel to get to the songs' hearts. It's clear that Khan's talent and ambition are both huge". PopMatters Erin Lyndal Martin felt that Khan "can do much better than some of the songs, which are weakened by synths, sophomoric lyrics, and sonic clutter." Martin continued, "While the weaker songs are definitely not throwaways, they miss the mark in more than one way." Andy Gill of The Independent found its "patina and keyboard tones" "blander" than Fur and Golds music and said that it is difficult to "take Khan's stories seriously when she slips into blather about 'a stranger in a strange land' and 'a vast and unknowable universe'." Robert Christgau of MSN Music found her "as ill-informed about astronomy as she is about love" and the musical experimentation "unworthy of your brainlength".

Slant Magazine placed the album at number 97 on its list of the best albums of the 2000s decade.

Track listing

Personnel
Credits adapted from the liner notes of Two Suns.

Musicians

 Natasha Khan – lead vocals ; backing vocals ; synths ; drum programming ; guitar ; piano ; harmonium ; handclaps ; percussion ; string machine ; drums ; bass synth ; vibraphone ; organ 
 Ben Christophers – Marxophone, pianochord ; synths ; guitar ; phonofiddle 
 Caroline Weeks – backing vocals ; synths, bells ; flute ; handclaps, percussion 
 Kath Mann – backing vocals, saw ; violin ; viola 
 Alex Thomas – drums ; percussion ; timpani 
 David Kosten – drum programming ; synths ; percussion ; synth drone ; toms, fingers 
 Abi Fry – viola 
 Adem – sampled wine glasses 
 Ira Wolf Tuton – bass 
 Chris Keating – drum programming 
 Devin Maxwell – timpani 
 Devon Dunaway – backing vocals 
 Robert Roseberry Jr. – backing vocals 
 Lydia Rhodes – backing vocals 
 Marcie Allen – backing vocals 
 Rachael Sell – backing vocals 
 Brian Hale – guitar 
 Louis P. Rogai Jr. – backing vocals 
 Tom Asselin – guitar 
 Scott Walker – additional vocals

Technical
 Natasha Khan – production ; engineering 
 David Kosten – production, engineering ; mixing 
 David Wrench – engineering 
 Mark Eastwood – mixing assistance 
 Brian Thorn – engineering assistance 
 Mike Nesci – engineering 
 Matt Boynton – engineering 
 Tim Bader – engineering assistance 
 Tom Asselin – engineering 
 Matt Lawrence – vocal recording (Scott Walker's vocals)

Artwork
 Natasha Khan – art direction, booklet artwork, concept
 David Benjamin Sherry – cover photography
 Tony Hornecker – set design
 Andrew Murabito – graphic design
 Dan Sanders – photographic production

Charts

Weekly charts

Year-end charts

Certifications

Release history

Notes

References

2009 albums
Bat for Lashes albums
Parlophone albums